Strointsi may refer to:

Strointsi, Vinnytsia Oblast, a village in Vinnytsia Oblast, Ukraine
Strointsi, Chernivtsi Oblast, a village in Chernivtsi Oblast, Ukraine